Egashira (written: 江頭) is a Japanese surname. Notable people with the surname include:

, better known as Egashira 2:50, Japanese comedian
, Japanese footballer
, Japanese businessman

Japanese-language surnames